Mircea (AKA: Proud Heritage) is a 1989 film about Mircea the Elder, the Christian king of Wallachia who repelled the attempts at conquest made by the Ottoman Empire in the late 14th century and early 15th century.  The film  also depicts a young Vlad the Impaler, Mircea's grandson, who would succeed him on the throne and continue his legacy of resistance against the Ottoman invasion.

The screenplay was written by Titus Popovici and the film was directed by Sergiu Nicolaescu. In the film, the main character is named Mircea the Great, avoiding the wording Mircea the Elder in order not to be associated with the advanced age of Nicolae Ceaușescu (71 years old in 1989). After being edited at the direction of Ceaușescu (who disliked several aspects of the movie), the film premiered at the Patria Cinema in Bucharest, on November 17, 1989, just one month before the start of the Romanian Revolution.

Cast
Sergiu Nicolaescu as Mircea I of Wallachia
Adrian Pintea as Vlad II Dracul
Șerban Ionescu as Michael I of Wallachia, Mircea's son
 as Vlad III the Impaler
Colea Răutu as Izzeddin Bey
Vladimir Găitan as Sigismund, Holy Roman Emperor
Silviu Stănculescu as Ene Udobă
Ion Besoiu as the priest Gerolamo
 as Bayezid I
George Alexandru as Mehmed I
 as Elisaveta
Manuela Hărăbor as Irina
 as Dan I of Wallachia, Mircea's stepbrother
 as Ion Iercău
 as Jean de Nevers
 as the archer Will Stapleton

See also
 List of historical drama films

References

External links
 

1989 films
Films set in the 14th century
Films set in the 15th century
Films set in Romania
Films directed by Sergiu Nicolaescu
Romanian biographical films
Romanian historical films
1980s war films
1980s historical films
1980s biographical films
1980s Romanian-language films